Joanna Mytkowska (1970) is a Polish curator and art critic. She has been the director of the Museum of Modern Art, Warsaw since 2007. She is the co-founder of the Foksal Gallery Foundation, which since 2001 has been operating independently from the Foksal Gallery.

Life and work

Joanna Mytkowska studied at the University of Warsaw from 1988 to 1994. She was the curator of the Artur Żmijewski exhibition at the Polish Pavilion during the 51st Venice Biennale (2005).

She organized the following exhibits for the Centre Georges Pompidou: Paweł Althamer (2006), The Magellanic Cloud (2007), The Anxious (2008) and Promises of the Past (2010).

Joanna Mytkowska was a member of the selection committee for Documenta 14, which took place in 2017.

In December 2018 she was awarded the Igor Zabel Award for her curatorial and intellectual achievements at the Museum of Modern Art in Warsaw.

References 

1970 births
Living people
Directors of museums in Poland
Polish art critics
Polish art historians
Polish curators
Polish women curators
Women art critics